The 1976–77 Yorkshire Cup was the sixty-ninth occasion on which the  Yorkshire Cup competition had been held.

Leeds won the trophy by beating Featherstone Rovers by the score of 16-12.

The match was played at Headingley, Leeds, now in West Yorkshire. The attendance was 7,645 and receipts were £5,198.

This was Leeds' sixth victory (and the second of two consecutive victories) in what would be eight times in the space of thirteen seasons.

It as also Featherstone Rovers's first of two consecutive Yorkshire Cup final appearances, both of which resulted in a defeat.

Background 
This season there were no junior/amateur clubs taking part, no new entrants and no "leavers" and so the total of entries remained the  same at sixteen.

This in turn resulted in no byes in the first round.

Competition and results

Round 1 
Involved  8 matches (with no byes) and 16 clubs

Round 2 - Quarter-finals 
Involved 4 matches and 8 clubs

Round 2 - replays  
Involved  1 match and 2 clubs

Round 3 – Semi-finals  
Involved 2 matches and 4 clubs

Final

Teams and scorers 

Scoring - Try = three points - Goal = two points - Drop goal = one point

The road to success

Notes and comments 
1 * The attendance is given as 7,644 by RUGBYLEAGUEproject  but the  Rothmans Rugby League Yearbook of 1991-92 and 1990-91 gives the  attendance as one more at 7,645
2 * Headingley, Leeds, is the home ground of Leeds RLFC with a capacity of 21,000. The record attendance was  40,175 for a league match between Leeds and Bradford Northern on 21 May 1947.

See also 
1976–77 Northern Rugby Football League season
Rugby league county cups

References

External links
Saints Heritage Society
1896–97 Northern Rugby Football Union season at wigan.rlfans.com 
Hull&Proud Fixtures & Results 1896/1897
Widnes Vikings - One team, one passion Season In Review - 1896-97
The Northern Union at warringtonwolves.org

1976 in English rugby league
RFL Yorkshire Cup